Muhamad Aznil bin Bidin (born 4 June 1994), is a Malaysian weightlifter who won the gold medal in the men's 62 kg weight class at the 2018 Commonwealth Games in Gold Coast, Australia.

References

External links

1994 births
Living people
Malaysian people of Malay descent
Malaysian male weightlifters
Weightlifters at the 2018 Commonwealth Games
Weightlifters at the 2022 Commonwealth Games
Southeast Asian Games silver medalists for Malaysia
Southeast Asian Games bronze medalists for Malaysia
Competitors at the 2019 Southeast Asian Games
Competitors at the 2021 Southeast Asian Games
Southeast Asian Games medalists in weightlifting
20th-century Malaysian people
21st-century Malaysian people
Commonwealth Games gold medallists for Malaysia
Commonwealth Games medallists in weightlifting
Medallists at the 2018 Commonwealth Games